Salcia may refer to several places:

Moldova
Salcia, Șoldănești, a commune in Şoldăneşti district
Salcia, Taraclia, a commune in Taraclia district
Salcia, a village in Botnărești Commune, Anenii Noi district

Romania
 Salcia, Mehedinți, a commune in Mehedinţi County
 Salcia, Prahova, a commune in Prahova County
 Salcia, Teleorman, a commune in Teleorman County
 Salcia, a village in Frecăţei Commune, Brăila County
 Salcia, a village in Tisău Commune, Buzău County
 Salcia, a village in Argetoaia Commune, Dolj County
 Salcia, a village in Umbrărești Commune, Galaţi County
 Salcia, a village in Slătioara Commune, Olt County
 Salcia Nouă and Salcia Veche, villages in Ciorăști Commune, Vrancea County
 Salcia, a forced labour camp under Communist rule on Great Brăila Island

Rivers
 Šalčia, a river in Lithuania, tributary of Merkys
 Salcia (Ier), a river in Romania, tributary of Ier
 Salcia, a river in Romania, tributary of Bistrița
 Salcia (Ialomița), a river in Romania, tributary of Cricovul Sărat

See also
Sălcuța (disambiguation)
Sălcioara (disambiguation)